The TNA 2004 World X Cup Tournament was an X Division tournament that was hosted by Total Nonstop Action Wrestling. It was the successor to America's X Cup Tournament.

History
America's X Cup Tournament was used somewhat as a preview for the World X Cup Tournament. America's X Cup featured four Teams: Team USA (representing the National Wrestling Alliance/Total Nonstop Action Wrestling), Team Canada, Team Mexico (representing AAA), and Team Britain. The concept of America's X Cup was that it was to be defended by Team USA against challengers from around the world. In an upsetting turn of events for Team USA, Team Mexico virtually dominated the international competition and ended up being the eventual winners of America's X Cup.

Rules 
The competition is divided into four rounds.
In Round One, there will be a gauntlet involving all 16 wrestlers. The winner gets three points for their respective team
In Round Two, there are two tag team matches. The winners get two points for their respective teams.
In Round Three, there will be a Ladder match involving 1 member from each team. The winner gets four points for their respective teams.
In Round Four, there will be an Ultimate X match involving 1 member from the top 3 teams. (The team in last place is eliminated). The winner gets five points for their respective team.
In the event of a tie, the captains of the two teams will compete in a singles match in order to determine the champion.

Teams and Members 

Team TNA
 Jerry Lynn (Captain)
 Christopher Daniels
 Chris Sabin
 Elix Skipper

Team Canada
 Petey Williams (Captain)
 Johnny Devine
 Bobby Roode
 Eric Young

Team Mexico
 Héctor Garza (Captain)
 Abismo Negro
 Heavy Metal
 Mr. Águila

Team Japan
 NOSAWA (Captain)
 Ryuji Hijikata
 Mitsu Hirai Jr.
 Taichi Ishikari

Preview Matches
TNA Weekly PPV 91: April 28, 2004
 Team TNA defeated  Team Mexico
''TNA Weekly PPV 92: May 5, 2004 Team Canada defeated  Team TNATNA Weekly PPV 93: May 12, 2004 Team Canada's Bobby Roode & Petey Williams defeated  Team Mexico's Héctor Garza & Abismo NegroTNA Weekly PPV 94: May 19, 2004 Team TNA's Jerry Lynn defeated  Team Canada's Bobby Roode
 Team Mexico defeated  Team Japan

Results
 Round One (The Gauntlet) - 3 Points TNA Weekly PPV 95: May 26, 200416-man Gauntlet:  Team Mexico's Héctor Garza was the last remaining competitor, thus winning the match

 Round Two (Tag Team Matches) - 2 Points TNA Weekly PPV 95: May 26, 2004 Team TNA's (Christopher Daniels and Elix Skipper) defeated  Team Canada's (Bobby Roode and Johnny Devine)
 Team Japan's (Ryuji Hijikata and Mitsu Hirai Jr.) defeated  Team Mexico's (Abismo Negro and Heavy Metal)

 Round Three (Ladder Match) - 4 Points TNA Weekly PPV 95: May 26, 2004 Team Canada's Eric Young defeated  Team TNA's Jerry Lynn,  Team Mexico's Mr. Águila and  Team Japan's Taichi Ishikari

 Round Four (Ultimate X Match) - 5 Points TNA Weekly PPV 95'': May 26, 2004
 Team TNA's Chris Sabin defeated  Team Canada's Petey Williams and  Team Mexico's Héctor Garza

Standings

World X Cup Events 
The World X Cup Tournament began almost immediately after Team AAA was decisively victorious in America's X Cup Tournament. Team Britain departed from TNA after America's X Cup ended, and Team Japan was brought in to fill the gap. Several Team changes were also made during the World X Cup. Team Mexico's Captain, Juventud Guerrera, was released from TNA after an in-ring accident involving Team USA's Captain, Jerry Lynn. Hector Garza took Guerrera's place as the Team Captain during the end of America's X Cup and the entire duration of the World X Cup.

Despite a strong showing from Team Mexico during America's X Cup events, Team USA enjoyed the majority of the success during the World X Cup. Team Japan was eventually eliminated from the tournament and it came down to the United States vs. Canada vs. Mexico in an Ultimate X match. Representing Team Canada was "The Canadian Destroyer" Captain Petey Williams. Representing Team Mexico was Captain Hector Garza. Despite the fact that both Canada and Mexico used their Team Captains for the Ultimate X match, Team USA was represented by Captain Jerry Lynn's hand-picked selection, Chris Sabin. This proved to be a wise decision for Team USA, as Sabin was able to defeat Williams and Garza and win the World X Cup Tournament for Team USA and the NWA/TNA.

See also
TNA X Cup Tournaments
TNA 2003 Super X Cup Tournament
TNA 2004 America's X Cup Tournament
TNA 2005 Super X Cup Tournament
TNA 2006 World X Cup Tournament
TNA 2008 World X Cup Tournament

External links
TNAWrestling.com (Official Website of TNA Wrestling)

Impact Wrestling tournaments
2004 in professional wrestling